Morgan Uceny (born March 10, 1985) is a retired American track and field athlete who specialized in middle distance running. Uceny won three national championships and was the 2011 IAAF Diamond League Champion at 1500 meters. She ended 2011 as the first American since 1985 to be ranked number one in the world in the 1500 m by Track & Field News.

She represented her country at the 2012 Summer Olympics, 2007 Pan American Games and the 2011 World Championships in Athletics. Her personal records are 1:58.37 minutes for the 800 meters and 4:00.06 minutes for the 1500 meters.

Personal life
Uceny was raised in Plymouth, Indiana, with her father, Marty, her mother, Brenda, and her two older brothers Alex and Matt. She is of Czech descent through her great-grandfather. As a child she loved basketball and aspired to play in the WNBA.  She ran track and played basketball in high school, also running cross-country her freshman and sophomore years, but decided to quit and focus on basketball and track. She won the state 800 meter championship her Junior year. In March 2017, Morgan married professional rock climber Shane Messer.

College career
Uceny attended Cornell University and graduated in 2007 as a Four-Time All-American: Indoor 800m (2006, 2007) & Outdoor 800m (2005, 2007).

Professional career
Uceny took a bronze medal over 800 m at the 2008 USA Indoor Track and Field Championships and was the winner in the mile at the  2010 indoor nationals.

In the 2011 season she won the 1500 m at the Brussels Diamond League, out-sprinting a loaded field and setting the world leading time of 4:00.06, with a closing 400m of 61 seconds. At the 2011 IAAF World Championships in Daegu, she was tripped by Kenyan runner Hellen Obiri who had fallen, and ended up placing 10th in the final, well out of medal contention. Despite the result, Uceny finished the 2011 season ranked No.1 in the world.

Uceny won the national titles in the 1500 m  at the 2012 US track and field Olympic Trials, qualifying for her first Olympics, alongside Shannon Rowbury, and Jenny Simpson.  At the London Games, Uceny and Rowbury made it to the final, but a mid-race clash with Ekaterina Kostetskaya meant she fell hard onto the track as the pack moved on, injuring her back and right side. She did not finish the race and left the stadium in tears.

Uceny once again made the 1500 m final at the 2014 USA Championships, but was clipped around halfway through the race and fell. Uceny ran 4:04.76 in the 1500 metres at the Paris Diamond League to redeem herself and this was her fastest time since 2012 summer.

Uceny ran a 4:11.18 1500 m en route to 4:29.39 mile at Fort Washington Avenue Armory. Uceny ran a season best 4:09.31 1500 m at June 2015 Sainsbury's Birmingham Grand Prix. At US championship 1500 m, Uceny finished 21st. Uceny ran a season best 4:34.02 mile at Sir Walter Miler hosted by Meredith College.

Uceny ran 4:09.21 1500 m at NYRR Millrose Games. Uceny ran 2:02.00 near Boston, Massachusetts, 4:03.94 for 1500 at Furman University elite women race, placed 5th at the 1500 m final at 2016 US Olympic Trials (track and field) and placed 10th in 4:24.6 at 2016 Fifth Avenue Mile. Olympian and former world number one Morgan Uceny has announced her retirement from professional track and field.

International competitions

National championships

References

External links 

1985 births
Living people
People from Plymouth, Indiana
Track and field athletes from Indiana
American female middle-distance runners
Olympic track and field athletes of the United States
Athletes (track and field) at the 2012 Summer Olympics
Pan American Games track and field athletes for the United States
Athletes (track and field) at the 2007 Pan American Games
World Athletics Championships athletes for the United States
Cornell University alumni
American people of Czech descent
Diamond League winners
USA Outdoor Track and Field Championships winners
USA Indoor Track and Field Championships winners
21st-century American women